Fljótavík is a wide bay in the far north-west of Hornstrandir, in the Westfjords region in Iceland. It is a part of the nature reserve Hornstrandafriðland (status granted in 1975) which covers the northernmost tip of the Hornstrandir peninsula.

A deep valley rises from the bay and a shallow inlet(which is more of a lagoon).

It was settled during the settler age by Geirmundur heljarskinn who also settled nearby inlet and valleys. The area was deserted around the mid 20th century but the descendants of the former inhabitants dwell there on occasion in summer cottages.

Icelandic post-rock band Sigur Rós named the ninth track of their 2008 album Með suð í eyrum við spilum endalaust after Fljótavík.

References 
 Fljotavik.is – An information page in Icelandic about Fljótavík

Westfjords